Keith Sonnier (July 31, 1941 – July 18, 2020) was a postminimalist sculptor, performance artist, video and light artist. Sonnier was one of the first artists to use light in sculpture in the 1960s. With his use of neon in combination with ephemeral materials he achieved international recognition. Sonnier was part of the Process Art movement.

Biography 
James Keith Sonnier was born July 31, 1941, in Mamou, Louisiana. His family was Cajun and Roman Catholic. His father was a hardware store owner, Joseph Sonnier, and his mother was a florist and singer, Mae Ledoux.

He graduated in 1963 from Southwestern Louisiana Institute (now known as the University of Louisiana at Lafayette). In 1966, he graduated with his MFA degree from Rutgers University, where he studied under Allan Kaprow, Robert Watts, and Robert Morris. After graduation from Rutgers, he moved to New York City with Jackie Winsor and some of his former classmates.

At the time of his death he lived in Bridgehampton, New York. Sonnier died in Southampton, NY on July 18, 2020, of MDS (Myelodysplastic syndrome) and complications from it at the age of 78.

Work
Sonnier began experimenting with neon in 1968. Neon lights became a signature material used in his sculptural works. The common materials Sonnier employed included neon and fluorescent lights; reflective materials; aluminum and copper; and glass and wires.

His postminimalist and sculpture contemporaries included Bruce Nauman, Eva Hesse, Richard Serra, Richard Tuttle, Jackie Winsor, and Barry LeVa.

Personal life 
In 1966 he married the sculptor Jackie Winsor, who at the time was a fellow art student from Rutgers University. His marriage to Winsor ended in divorce in1980.

HIs second marriage was in 1987 to Nessia Leonzini Pope, ending in divorce by 1998. He had one child from his second marriage.

References

External links
Keith Sonnier in the National Gallery of Australia's Kenneth Tyler Collection
Askart.com
Keith Sonnier in the Video Data Bank

1941 births
2020 deaths
People from Mamou, Louisiana
American video artists
Neon artists
Minimalist artists
Artists from Louisiana
Sculptors from Louisiana